Juan Bautista H. Alegre III (born June 4, 1955), known professionally as Johnny Alegre, is a jazz guitarist and composer from Manila, Philippines. He leads the jazz group Johnny Alegre Affinity and the world music group Humanfolk.

Biography

Career

Alegre studied composition at the University of the Philippines College of Music in the latter 1970s. He was a founding member of the U.P. Jazz Ensemble. He participated in workshops by composer Erhard Karkoschka, guitarist Ike Isaacs, and composer Chou Wen-chung.

In May 2002, Alegre formed the Johnny Alegre Affinity with bassist Colby de la Calzada, drummer Koko Bermejo, pianist Elhmir Saison, and saxophonist Tots Tolentino. Their first recorded work, "Stones of Intramuros", written by Alegre, was included in the limited edition Philippine jazz anthology Adobo Jazz: A Portrait of the Filipino as a Jazz Artist (Vol. 1).

The self-titled album Johnny Alegre Affinity was released in the Philippines in mid-2005 by Candid Records Philippines; and was re-released in England the same year by Candid Records (UK) for global distribution as Jazzhound. This was followed by performances at the PizzaExpress Jazz Club in London with guest saxophonist, Dimitri Vassilakis.

During 2006 and 2007, Alegre and Affinity worked on Eastern Skies, an album of original compositions with the Global Studio Orchestra conducted by Gerard Salonga.  In 2009 MCA released Johnny Alegre 3, a trio album with Ron McClure (bass) and Billy Hart (drums). Alegre was MCA's first jazz act from the Philippines.  In 2014, MCA released a compilation of highlights from Alegre's Candid Records recordings, entitled Stories.

In 2008, Alegre recorded Humanfolk, the name of an album and a band formed with percussionist Susie Ibarra, drummer Roberto Juan Rodriguez, Cynthia Alexander, and Malek Lopez. For Humanfolk he wrote "Para Sa Tao" based on the Baybayin letters of the tagalog language.

Alegre is profiled in the books The Great Jazz Guitarists by Scott Yanow and the Cultural Center of the Philippines Encyclopedia of Philippine Art, Second edition (Volume 7).

Family
Johnny Alegre is the youngest surviving grandchild of the late Sen. Juan Bautista Alegre y Levantino, senator who represented the 6th Senatorial District of the Bicol Region to the 6th and 7th Philippine Legislatures.  The family genealogy of Johnny Alegre is descended from Carlist exiles from Spain to the Philippines and intermarried with Filipinos.  His paternal grandmother, Amanda ("Aimee") Alegre née Sargent, is descended from the early Sargent family of New England.

Affiliations

Alegre is a member of FILSCAP, the Jazz Society of the Philippines, and served a term as a consultant of the Philippine International Jazz and Arts Festival.

Other than his activities in jazz, World and Philippine music, Alegre was an officer of the now-defunct Wikimedia Philippines, the national chapter of the Wikimedia Foundation in the Philippines; and was the fourth president of the said chapter from July 2014 to June 2015. 
As part of his social commitment he was a past president of the Rotary Club of Makati Rockwell of Rotary International District 3830, serving his term in the Rotary Year of 2018–2019, and was conferred a Paul Harris fellowship.
In 2022, he was voted president of the affiliate Wikimedia user group, Philippine Wikimedia Community User Group or PhilWiki Community (PH-WC).

Discography

Collaborations

Videography

Johnny Alegre Affinity

Humanfolk

Awards

Paternal line

Images

References

External links

 
 
 

Jazz fusion guitarists
Lead guitarists
Filipino jazz guitarists
Palanca Award recipients
1955 births
Living people
Candid Records artists
MCA Music Inc. (Philippines) artists
Wikimedia Philippines
Filipino jazz composers
Filipino jazz musicians
Filipino record producers
20th-century guitarists
20th-century jazz composers
21st-century guitarists
21st-century jazz composers